The Whip is the alias used by different characters in DC Comics with four of them being superheroes. The third one made his first appearance in Flash Comics #1. The fourth Whip appeared in 2005 and was created by Grant Morrison. The fifth Whip appeared in 2011 and was created by Fabian Nicieza.

Fictional character biography

Fernando Suarez (El Castigo)
The first Whip was Don Fernando Suarez. In 1840s Mexico, Fernando was the protector of the poor in a small Mexican town. His name was El Castigo, which was incorrectly translated from Spanish as The Whip (it should be "The Punishment").

Johnny Lash
The second Whip had no relation to Don Fernando. His name was Johnny Lash, and he appeared in Crack Western #70, published by Quality Comics.

Rodney Gaynor
On a trip to the United States, Rodrigo "Rodney" Elwood Gaynor (a descendant of Don Fernando Suarez, the original Whip) was deeply disturbed at the treatment of the poor citizens of a small Mexican town. Once Rodney discovered his ancestor's alter-ego of the Whip, he revived the logo and with the help of his horse King, began to fight the evil land barons who so mercilessly taxed the poor. Rodney would sometimes team up with the Vigilante and became a member of the All-Star Squadron.

Shelly Gaynor
Shelly Gaynor, granddaughter of Rod Gaynor, worked as a columnist for the Daily Recorder, a well-known newspaper. Shelly decided to do an in-depth study on what it was like to be a superhero, or as she called a Super Cowboy. Her first book on superheroics was called "Body Thunder: How I Turned My Body Into A Living Weapon To Beat The 21st Century Blues". Just like her grandfather before her, she decided to revive the Whip logo.

Her first appearance in comic books was Seven Soldiers #0, where she became a part of an ill-fated team of six superheroes rounded up by Greg Saunders. Shelly had a sexual relationship with teammate I, Spyder, and was killed along with the rest of the team by the Sheeda, an evil race of beings who hunt down civilizations but always leave enough survivors  for the race to continue.

She was mentioned in Midnighter #3 (October 2015), with a character reading "Shelly Gaynor's latest".

Unnamed assassin
Another female Whip, presumably unconnected to any of the previous versions, appeared as a member of the League of Assassins. She battled Azrael and Red Robin at several points.

In other media
 In the Batwoman episode "A Lesson from Professor Pyg", Ryan and Alice were tracking someone who's using a bullwhip and believing Whip is doing all of this. It was later revealed that it's Flamingo who's doing all of the victims.

References

External links
 The Whip (Don Suarez) at the DCU Guide
 
 The Whip (Johnny Lash) at the DCU Guide
 The Whip (Rodrigo Gaynor) at the DCU Guide
 
 The Whip (Shelly Gaynor) at the DCU Guide
 
 The Whip (Rodney Gaynor) at Don Markstein's Toonopedia. Archived from the original on September 2, 2015.

Articles about multiple fictional characters
Characters created by Fabian Nicieza
Characters created by Grant Morrison
Comics characters introduced in 1940
Comics characters introduced in 1951
Comics characters introduced in 2005
Comics characters introduced in 2011
DC Comics superheroes
DC Comics male superheroes
DC Comics female superheroes
Mexican superheroes
Fictional writers
Golden Age superheroes
Fictional people from the 19th-century